Halsanaustan or just Halsa is a village in Heim Municipality in Trøndelag county, Norway. There is a ferry from Halsanausta to the village of Kanestraum in Tingvoll Municipality, across the Halsafjorden. Halsa Church is located in this village.

References

Heim, Norway
Villages in Trøndelag